Eastchase is a neighborhood of the city of Fort Worth, Texas. It is located south of Interstate 30 and bordered on the east and south by the city of Arlington.

Demographics
The neighborhood has a population of 5,083 people, and a population density of 2,521 people per square mile, less than the Fort Worth average of 2,715.

References

Neighborhoods in Fort Worth, Texas